Curtis Carter may refer to:

Curtis L. Carter, academic
Curtis Carter (basketball)
Curtis P. Carter, a character in the 1949 film Alimony